The Hochalmspitze (3,360  metres above the Adriatic (11,020 ft)) is located east of Mallnitz in the Austrian state of Carinthia. It is sometimes called "Tauern Queen" as a counterpart to the "Tauern King", the Grossglockner.

Geography

The peak is situated slightly south the main ridge of the Central Eastern Alps and the Alpine divide. It actually consists of two pinnacles, the Schneeige Hochalmspitze and the higher Apere ("snowless") Hochalmspitze with the summit cross. It has glaciers on its eastern and southern sides.

Like most of the High Tauern, the Hochalmspitze massif is formed of granite and gneiss, and many unusual rock formations can be found on its slopes. The mountain lies at the Eastern end of the range. In the northwest, a ridge connects it to Großer Ankogel, the third highest peak in its group, and to the Kölnbrein Dam. In the south, the Mallnitz Ridge leads to the neighbouring Reisseck Group.

From the summit, the views stretch as far as the Salzburg Alps, the Dolomites and the Julian Alps.

History
The first official ascent was made in 1859 by the Austrian mountaineer Paul Grohmann, although letters found in 2010 bring this claim into disrepute, as the mountain may have first been climbed four years earlier.

In the 1970s plans for a glacier ski resort were developed, but finally abandoned in 1988 when the Austrian Alpine Club was able to purchase large parts of the area.

References

Alpine three-thousanders
Ankogel Group
Mountains of the Alps
Mountains of Carinthia (state)